The Morgan Covered Bridge, also known as the Upper Covered Bridge is a wooden covered bridge that crosses the North Branch Lamoille River in Belvidere, Vermont on Morgan Bridge Road. Built about 1887, it is one of two covered bridges in Belvidere, and one of five in a five-mile span that all cross the same river. It was listed on the National Register of Historic Places in 1974.

Description
The Morgan Covered Bridge is located west of the center of Belvidere, carrying Morgan Bridge Road, a short connector between Back Road (running on the north side of the North Branch Lamoille River) and Vermont Route 109 (running to its south). Its trusses include iron rods joining the apexes of the diagonals to the bottom chords. It has a gabled metal roof, and its exterior is finished in vertical board siding, which wraps around to the insides of the portals. The siding stops short of the eaves, leaving an open strip below the roof. The portal openings are framed as segmented arches. The bridge rests on abutments of stone and concrete.

History
The bridge was built by Lewis Robinson, Charles Leonard and Fred Tracy. It is one of two 19th-century covered bridges (the other is the Mill Covered Bridge further west), and one of five on the North Branch Lamoille in Belvidere or neighboring Waterville, all within a five-mile span.

There have been no major repairs necessary with this bridge recently, save for a new standing seam metal roof which a large number of covered bridges in Vermont received due to a grant. A study in the 1990s by the Vermont Agency of Transportation revealed that certain design details of the trusses allowed the bridge to be rated for a 9-ton load (1 ton more than the standard load limit for wooden deck bridges). At this time, a sign at the bridge posts the limit at 5 tons.

See also
List of Vermont covered bridges
List of bridges documented by the Historic American Engineering Record in Vermont
List of bridges on the National Register of Historic Places in Vermont
National Register of Historic Places listings in Lamoille County, Vermont

References

External links

Buildings and structures in Belvidere, Vermont
Bridges completed in 1887
Covered bridges on the National Register of Historic Places in Vermont
Wooden bridges in Vermont
Covered bridges in Lamoille County, Vermont
Historic American Engineering Record in Vermont
National Register of Historic Places in Lamoille County, Vermont
Road bridges on the National Register of Historic Places in Vermont
Lattice truss bridges in the United States
1887 establishments in Vermont